Lorenzo Tonelli (born 17 January 1990) is an Italian professional footballer who plays as a centre-back for Serie A club Empoli.

Club career
Born in Florence, Tuscany, Tonelli started his professional career at Empoli. He made his debut during the 2010–11 Serie B season. He made his first appearance on 5 September 2010.

On 26 April 2015, Tonelli was punched by Atalanta's Germán Denis after he burst into the Empoli dressing room; Denis was subsequently given a five-match ban for this action on Tonelli.

Tonelli enjoyed his breakthrough in the 2014–15 season under then manager Maurizio Sarri, attracting the attention of some of the top Italian teams. On 23 May 2016, it was announced that Tonelli had signed for Napoli. The transfer fee was reported as being €10 million. On 7 January 2017, Tonelli made his Napoli debut, scoring the match-winning goal in the 95th minute of a 2–1 home win over Sampdoria.

On 17 August 2018, Tonelli joined Serie A side Sampdoria on loan until 30 June 2019.

On 23 January 2020, he joined Sampdoria on another loan until the end of the 2019–20 season, at the end of which Sampdoria will have an obligation to purchase his rights permanently. He also signed a contract with Sampdoria until 30 June 2022.

On 27 August 2021, Tonelli return to Empoli after 5 years.

International career
Under the new regime of Ciro Ferrara, he received his first call-up for Italy U-21 on 11 November 2010. He made his debut on 17 November 2010, replacing Giulio Donati in the second half of the friendly match, winning against Turkey U21 2–1. He was called up  for an Italy training camp on 16 May 2016. He was given his first official senior call-up for Italy in October 2018 by manager Roberto Mancini, following injuries to several players in the team.

Career statistics

References

External links
 FIGC National Teams Archive 
 La Gazzetta dello Sport Profile 
 AIC.Football.it Profile 

Living people
1990 births
Footballers from Florence
Association football defenders
Italian footballers
Italy youth international footballers
Italy under-21 international footballers
Serie A players
Serie B players
Empoli F.C. players
S.S.C. Napoli players
U.C. Sampdoria players